Milton Range is a rifle range east of Gravesend.

Police Training Centre
There is an establishment for the training of specialist police officers. It includes a mock high street with replicas of shops such as a Post Office, a Barclays bank & a Your Move estate agents. There are also 2 trains, a London Underground 1959 stock, & a BR Class 303 driving trailer unit.

References

Gravesend, Kent
Law enforcement in the United Kingdom
Shooting ranges in the United Kingdom
Rifle ranges